Job Hortop was an English adventurer who enlisted as chief gunner on John Hawkins' third voyage to the Caribbean. He became stranded and was captured by the Spanish authorities after the Battle of San Juan de Ulúa (1568) and used as a galley slave. A ship in which he was serving was subsequently captured, and he returned to England.

See also
 Master Gunner

Notes

External links
Mary W. S. Hawkins' account of the voyage

16th-century English people